SS Samuel G. French was a Liberty ship built in the United States during World War II. She was named after Samuel G. French, a United States Military Academy graduate in 1843, he obtained the rank of Captain in the US Army and was a veteran of the Mexican–American War. French joined the Confederate States Army during the American Civil War and rose to the rank of Major General.

Construction
Samuel G. French was laid down on 31 January 1944, under a Maritime Commission (MARCOM) contract, MC hull 2294, by J.A. Jones Construction, Panama City, Florida; sponsored by Miss Ada French, granddaughter of namesake, she was launched on 21 March 1944.

History
She was allocated to Oliver J. Olson & Company, on 22 April 1944. On 25 May 1946, she was laid up in the National Defense Reserve Fleet, in the Hudson River Group. On 25 November 1946, she was sold to the Netherlands for $549,890.31 for commercial use and renamed Egmond. After going through several more owners she was scrapped in Castellon, Spain, in 1971.

References

Bibliography

 
 
 
 
 

 

Liberty ships
Ships built in Panama City, Florida
1944 ships
Hudson River Reserve Fleet